Uitsig is a 71% white suburb of the city of Bloemfontein in South Africa. Average Household Income Range:	R25,600 - R34,000
Predominant LSM:	LSM 9 Low
Number Adults:	3175

Uitsig is a fairly new and still expanding suburb, but also has its more established parts and is located in the southern part of Bloemfontein. With the newly renovated and expanded Fauna Shopping Centre in close proximity, this is a very popular neighbourhood to live in. The centre holds the Checkers Hyper, Hi-Fi Corporation, several clothing stores, Game, Tekkie Town, Sportsman's Warehouse and the ever-popular Deeghuys also moved into the area! Access to the N1 is easy from Uitsig. The Life Rosepark Hospital is also nearby. Property in Uitsig ranges from comfortable family homes to townhouse complexes and a couple of clusters and duets. In terms of properties, it roughly consists of 70% houses and 30% sectional title properties like townhouses, flats or duets.

Schools in the suburb include Uitsig Primary School and Bloemfontein South High School.

This suburb offers excellent value for money as far as property investment is concerned.
	Amenity	Type	Distance (km)
	Caltex	Filling Station	0.89 km
	Engen - M10	Filling Station	1.15 km
	Engen - Lechwe Avn	Filling Station	1.18 km
	South African National Blood Services	Hospital/ Clinic	4.69 km
	Police SAPS - Batho	Police Station	3.69 km
	Police SAPS - Kagisanong	Police Station	4.36 km
	Police SAPS - Parkweg	Police Station	4.44 km
	Onze Rust Primary School	Primary School	0.05 km
	Laerskool Fauna	Primary School	1.27 km
	Bloemfontein South High School	Secondary School	1.29 km
	Kay's Centre	Shopping Centre	0.84 km
	Fleurdal Mall	Shopping Centre	0.97 km
	Bloem Value Mart	Shopping Centre	0.99 km
	University of the Free State Vista Campus	Tertiary Institution	2.77 km
	Central University of Technology - CUT - Free State	Tertiary Institution	4.43 km
	CUT - Engineering & IT	Tertiary Institution	4.43 km

References

Suburbs of Bloemfontein